My Famous Family is a British television programme on genealogy, co-hosted by Bill Oddie and Guy de la Bédoyère. Each episode shows an ordinary member of the public with a famous ancestor: Queen Victoria, Florence Nightingale, George Stephenson, Lawrence of Arabia, or the Duke of Wellington.

It was broadcast in 2007 on the UKTV History channel (now called Yesterday), one of the UKTV channels.

External links 
My Famous Family on Fulcrum TV dead link
My Famous Family on UKTV

2007 British television series debuts
2007 British television series endings
Television series about family history
UKTV original programming
English-language television shows